Frank Louis Tinkham (May 12, 1884 – August 1, 1963) was an American football and basketball coach.

Biography
Tinkham was a native of Russell, Iowa, and graduated from Coe College in Cedar Rapids, Iowa, in 1909.

Tinkham served as the head football coach, athletic director, and head men's basketball coach at Westminster College in Fulton, Missouri, during the 1909–10 academic year.

Tinkham later served as the head football coach at Westminster College in New Wilmington, Pennsylvania, from 1913 to 1914.

References

External links
 

1884 births
1963 deaths
Basketball coaches from Iowa
Westminster Blue Jays athletic directors
Westminster Blue Jays football coaches
Westminster Blue Jays men's basketball coaches
Westminster Titans football coaches
Coe College alumni
Princeton Theological Seminary alumni
People from Lucas County, Iowa